The politics of the Western Cape differs from that of most other provinces in South Africa, because, unlike the other provinces, the African National Congress (ANC) does not dominate the political landscape. The Western Cape's political landscape is also notable for the presence of a relatively strong local devolution and  independence movement.

Election history 
In the election of 2004, no party achieved an absolute majority in the province, with the ANC having a plurality of 45% of the votes. However, the ANC was in an alliance with the New National Party (NNP), which had 11% of the votes, which allowed the ANC-NNP coalition to form a provincial government. During the 2005 floor crossing period all of the NNP members of the Provincial Parliament moved to the ANC, giving the ANC an absolute majority in the province. The ANC chose Ebrahim Rasool as Premier; in 2008 he was replaced by Lynne Brown. The provincial leader of the ANC was Mcebisi Skwatsha.

The official opposition in the Western Cape after the 2004 elections was the Democratic Alliance (DA), which received 27% of the vote in the provincial ballot. The City of Cape Town, the most populous municipality in the province, was governed by a multi-party coalition led by the DA after the 2006 municipal elections. The DA increased its share of the vote during the 2011 municipal elections to 61.09%, giving them a firm majority and allowing them to govern the City of Cape Town without their former coalition partners 

In the election of 22 April 2009 the ANC was unseated by the DA, which took 51.46% of the vote. This election marked the first time since the end of apartheid that a party scored an overall majority in the province. The DA leader Helen Zille replaced Lynne Brown as Premier on 6 May 2009.

In the election of 7 May 2014 the DA maintained its hold on the province, increasing its majority to 59.4%.

In the election of 8 May 2019 the DA won a reduced majority of 55.45%.

Election results

References

See also
 Cape Independence
 Politics of South Africa
 Government of the Western Cape

Western Cape
Politics of South Africa by province